Peter Spir (born 6 November 1955) is a Canadian middle-distance runner. He competed in the men's 1500 metres at the 1976 Summer Olympics.

References

1955 births
Living people
Athletes (track and field) at the 1976 Summer Olympics
Canadian male middle-distance runners
Olympic track and field athletes of Canada
Athletes (track and field) at the 1979 Pan American Games
Pan American Games track and field athletes for Canada
English emigrants to Canada
Sportspeople from Manchester